Lubich is a surname. Notable people with this name include:
Berndt Lubich von Milovan, Hauptsturmführer (Captain) in the Waffen SS
Bronko Lubich (also known as Bronco Lubich), Hungarian-born Canadian professional wrestler
Chiara Lubich, Italian-born leader of Focolare Movement
Christian Lubich, author of mathematics books
David Lubich, editor and publisher of Soul Underground
Edo Lubich, Balkan musician and member of Tamburitza Orchestra
Frederick Alfred Lubich, Professor of German, Old Dominion University, Norfolk, Virginia
Jenia Lubich, Russian singer and recording artiste
Matthew Lubich, member of Broken Gopher Ink
Roberta Lubich, former wife of Pier Ferdinando Casini
Bruce Lubich, Professor of Accounting

See also
Lubichowo
Lubichowo Commune
Lubic, a character in the film Masters of the Universe
Ruth Lubic
Europa da się lubić
Lubicz coat of arms
Surnames